Heart Rhythm Meditation (commonly known as HRM) is a type of meditation that involves conscious breathing, in which the conscious control of breathing is meant to influence a person’s mental, emotional, or physical state, with a claimed therapeutic effect.

Background
Heart Rhythm Meditation is a method of meditation that has been expanded and developed by Puran Bair and Susanna Bair from iamHeart. The method was described in the 1998 book Living from the Heart, by Puran and Susanna Bair (3rd edition published in 2019) and in the 2007 book Energize Your Heart in 4 Dimensions, by Puran and Susanna Bair. The application of Heart Rhythm Meditation to the development of spiritual maturity is described in the book, Follow Your Heart, by Puran and Susanna Bair, edited and illustrated by Asatar Bair published in 2011.
The practice originates from the Jesus Prayer and the teachings of Inayat Khan, who founded the Sufi order and is credited with bringing Sufism to the Western world. Puran and Susanna Bair were disciples of Inayat Khan’s eldest son and successor Vilayat Inayat Khan. The HRM founders claim that their approach is non-religious, practical, and scientific.

Techniques

The method was described in the 1998 book Living from the Heart, by Puran Bair (3rd edition published in 2019) and in the 2007 book Energize Your Heart in 4 Dimensions, by Puran and Susanna Bair.
The method of HRM involves conscious breathing, use of the full lung capacity, a concentration on the heart (both the physical heart and the emotional or poetic heart) and an intervention in the breath to make it rhythmic, through the coordination of the breath and heartbeat.  
"The Full Breath" technique expands the vital capacity of the lungs with full and deep breathing, while slowing the breath rate to six breaths per minute or slower. This synchronizes breath and heartbeat, creating “entrainment,” a coherent pattern of Heart Rate Variability. Entrainment also decreases production of stress hormones and increases production of anti-stress hormones. Another pattern, “The Square Breath”, involves a longer holding of the breath, so that the holding period equals the breathing period, for example, 8 beats in, 16 beats hold, 8 beats out. The "Square Breath" method is applied for stabilizing quality of breathing in order to reduce anxiety or feelings of panic.  Research studies completed by the Heart Math Institute indicate that this sort of entrainment increases parasympathetic nervous system activity, associated with a calm, restful state.

See also

 Heart rate variability
 Western Sufism
 Transcendental Meditation
 Transcendentalism

References

Christian prayer
Christian terminology
Ināyati Sufis
 01
Sufi psychology
Meditation
 01
Mind–body interventions